BigPanda is a private software company headquartered in Mountain View, California. BigPanda Incident Intelligence and Automation, powered by AIOps, supports companies of all sizes to prevent service outages and improve incident management. 

BigPanda’s Incident Intelligence and Automation platform, powered by AIOps, empowers some of the world's largest brands to keep business running, prevent service outages, and improve incident management to deliver extraordinary customer experiences. BigPanda’s platform is critical for organizations across industries and for enterprises of all sizes—from small and medium to Fortune 500 companies—to power their digital services. 

BigPanda was founded in 2012 with $1.5 million in initial funding. Two years later, the company came out of stealth mode, took its software-as-a-service product out of beta, and announced $7 million in Series A funding. This was followed by a Series B funding round in 2015 that was originally for $16 million then grew by $23 million more. A Series C funding round in late 2019 raised another $50 million for international expansion and product development. BigPanda became valued at $1.2 billion following a new Series D & E round bringing its total capital to $340 million.

References

External links
 Official website

American companies established in 2012
Companies based in Mountain View, California
Software companies based in the San Francisco Bay Area
2012 establishments in California

he:ביגפנדה